Lonoak (formerly, Lone Oak and Loanoke) is an unincorporated community in Monterey County, California.

A post office operated at Lonoak from 1885 to 1954.

References

Unincorporated communities in California
Unincorporated communities in Monterey County, California